Ri Kun-mo, also translated as Ri Gun-mo (5 April 1926 – 2001) was a North Korean politician. He was Prime Minister from 29 December 1986 to 12 December 1988, when he was replaced, reportedly due to poor health. He succeeded Kang Song-san. His successor was Yon Hyong-muk.

In 1998 he was nominated Chief Secretary for North Hamgyong Province, but he was removed in 2001 and presumably died shortly thereafter.

See also
 Politics of North Korea

References

1926 births
2001 deaths
Prime Ministers of North Korea
Members of the 6th Politburo of the Workers' Party of Korea
Alternate members of the 6th Politburo of the Workers' Party of Korea
Members of the 6th Central Committee of the Workers' Party of Korea
People from South Pyongan